Gujarat cyclone may refer to:
1998 Gujarat cyclone
2001 Gujarat cyclone
2015 Gujarat cyclone